John Crittenden Sawhill (June 12, 1936 – May 18, 2000) was president and CEO of The Nature Conservancy and the 12th President of New York University (NYU).

Born in Cleveland, Ohio in 1936, Sawhill graduated from Princeton University's Woodrow Wilson School of Public and International Affairs in 1958. He earned a PhD in economics in 1963 from New York University, where he served as professor of economics. He was named president of New York University in 1975, serving until 1979. At a trying time in NYU's history, he received widespread acclaim for bringing about an academic and financial turnaround at the country's largest private university.

His research focused on the nonprofit sector, and he joined the Harvard Business School faculty in 1997 as part of the School's Initiative on Social Enterprise. His seminar Effective Leadership of Social Enterprises prepared students for leadership roles in nonprofit management.

Earlier he held several government positions during the Nixon, Ford and Carter administrations. Those included being Deputy Secretary of Energy; Chairman of the U.S. Synthetic Fuels Corporation; Administrator of the Federal Energy Administration (appointed by President Nixon, he resigned that position in October, 1974), and Associate Director for Natural Resources, Energy, Science and Environment in the Office of Management and Budget. In 1977, he was elected to the Common Cause National Governing Board.

During his ten-year tenure, The Nature Conservancy became the world's largest private conservation group and protected more than 7 million acres (28,000 km²) in the United States alone.

Sawhill, a senior lecturer at Harvard Business School and president and CEO of The Nature Conservancy, died of complications from diabetes May 18, 2000 at the age of 63.  His wife was Isabel Sawhill and his son was James W. Sawhill.

References

External links
John C. Sawhill Remembered
LA Times obit

|-

|-

1936 births
2000 deaths
20th-century American businesspeople
American chief executives
New York University alumni
Harvard Business School faculty
Businesspeople from Cleveland
Presidents of New York University
United States Deputy Secretaries of Energy
Princeton School of Public and International Affairs alumni
20th-century American academics